Aulis may refer to:

 Aulis (given name)
 Aulis (ancient Greece), an ancient Greek town in Boeotia, traditionally the port from which the Greek army set sail for the Trojan War
 Avlida, a modern Greek town, traditionally identified with ancient Aulis
 Aulis (mythology), a daughter of King Ogyges
 Aulis (beetle), a genus of ladybird beetle

See also
 Auli (disambiguation)